Old Du Quoin is an unincorporated community in Perry County, Illinois, United States. The community was the original site of Du Quoin before its residents relocated to a site next to a new railroad line in the 1850s.

References

Unincorporated communities in Perry County, Illinois
Unincorporated communities in Illinois